Dolge Company Factory Complex, also known as Alfred Dolge and Sons Felt and Sounding Board Factories and Daniel Green Factory Complex, is a national historic district located at Dolgeville in Herkimer County, New York. The district contains 10 contributing buildings and one contributing structure.  The complex includes a large limestone building built in 1886, a frame factory building, a double span Pratt truss bridge on limestone and concrete supports (1887), another large wood factory building, a complex of lesser buildings, and the Alfred Dolge mansion (1895).   The limestone factory structure is a long (300 by 700) feet, -story structure with a clerestory running the length of the roof ridge.  It features a mansard roofed tower with dormers. The complex was built by Alfred Dolge (1848–1922), who desired to establish an ideal society for his factory workers.  In the 1890s the complex was acquired by Daniel Green and William R. Green, who manufactured felt shoes and slippers. The mill is currently being used as an antique, second hand, and crafts shop.

It was listed on the National Register of Historic Places in 1974.

In late 2014 the Dolge mansion was destroyed in a fire.

Gallery

References

Industrial buildings and structures on the National Register of Historic Places in New York (state)
Historic districts on the National Register of Historic Places in New York (state)
Historic districts in Herkimer County, New York
National Register of Historic Places in Herkimer County, New York